In mathematics and theoretical physics, zeta function regularization is a type of regularization or summability method that assigns finite values to  divergent sums or products, and in particular can be used to define determinants and traces of some self-adjoint operators. The technique is now commonly applied to problems in physics, but has its origins in attempts to give precise meanings to ill-conditioned sums appearing in number theory.

Definition

There are several different summation methods called zeta function regularization for defining the sum of a possibly divergent series 

One method is to define its zeta regularized sum to be ζA(−1) if this is defined, where the zeta function is defined for large Re(s) by

if this sum converges, and by analytic continuation elsewhere.

In the case when an = n, the zeta function is the ordinary Riemann zeta function. This method was used by Euler to "sum" the series 1 + 2 + 3 + 4 + ... to ζ(−1) = −1/12.

 showed that in flat space, in which the eigenvalues of Laplacians are known, the zeta function corresponding to the partition function can be computed explicitly. Consider a scalar field φ contained in a large box of volume V in flat spacetime at the temperature T = β−1. The partition function is defined by a path integral over all fields φ on the Euclidean space obtained by putting τ = it which are zero on the walls of the box and which are periodic in τ with period β. In this situation from the partition function he computes energy, entropy and pressure of the radiation of the field φ. In case of flat spaces the eigenvalues appearing in the physical quantities are generally known, while in case of curved space they are  not known: in this case asymptotic methods are needed.

Another method defines the possibly divergent infinite product a1a2.... to be  exp(−ζ′A(0)).  used this to define the determinant of a positive self-adjoint operator A (the Laplacian of a Riemannian manifold in their application) with eigenvalues a1, a2, ...., and in this case the zeta function is formally the trace of A−s.  showed that if A is the Laplacian of a compact Riemannian manifold then the Minakshisundaram–Pleijel zeta function  converges and has an analytic continuation as a meromorphic function to all complex numbers, and  extended this to elliptic pseudo-differential operators A on compact Riemannian manifolds. So for such operators one can define the determinant using zeta function regularization. See "analytic torsion."

 suggested using this idea to evaluate path integrals in curved spacetimes. He studied zeta function regularization in order to calculate the partition functions for thermal graviton and matter's quanta in curved background such as on the horizon of black holes and on de Sitter background using the relation by the inverse Mellin transformation to the trace of the kernel of heat equations.

Example

The first example in which zeta function regularization is available appears in the Casimir effect, which is in a flat space with the bulk contributions of the quantum field in three space dimensions. In this case we must calculate the value of Riemann zeta function at -3, which diverges explicitly. However, it can be analytically continued to s=-3 where hopefully there is no pole, thus giving a finite value to the expression. A detailed example of this regularization at work is given in the article on the detail example of the Casimir effect, where the resulting sum is very explicitly the Riemann zeta-function (and where the seemingly legerdemain analytic continuation removes an additive infinity, leaving a physically significant finite number).

An example of zeta-function regularization is the calculation of the vacuum expectation value of the energy of a particle field in quantum field theory. More generally, the zeta-function approach can be used to regularize the whole energy–momentum tensor in curved spacetime.  

The unregulated value of the energy is given by a summation over the zero-point energy of all of the excitation modes of the vacuum:

Here,  is the zeroth component of the energy–momentum tensor and the sum (which may be an integral) is understood to extend over all (positive and negative) energy modes ; the absolute value reminding us that the energy is taken to be positive. This sum, as written, is usually infinite ( is typically linear in n). The sum may be regularized by writing it as

where s is some parameter, taken to be a complex number. For large, real s greater than 4 (for three-dimensional space), the sum is manifestly finite, and thus may often be evaluated theoretically.

The zeta-regularization is useful as it can often be used in a way such that the various symmetries of the physical system are preserved. Zeta-function regularization is used in conformal field theory, renormalization and in fixing the critical spacetime dimension of string theory.

Relation to other regularizations

Zeta function regularization is equivalent to  dimensional regularization, see. However, the main advantage of the zeta regularization is that it can be used whenever the dimensional regularization fails, for example if there are matrices or tensors inside the calculations

Relation to Dirichlet series

Zeta-function regularization gives an analytic structure to any sums over an arithmetic function f(n). Such sums are known as Dirichlet series. The regularized form

converts divergences of the sum into simple poles on the complex s-plane.  In numerical calculations, the zeta-function regularization is inappropriate, as it is extremely slow to converge. For numerical purposes, a more rapidly converging sum is the exponential regularization, given by

This is sometimes called the Z-transform of f, where z = exp(−t). The analytic structure of the exponential and zeta-regularizations are related.  By expanding the exponential sum as a Laurent series

one finds that the zeta-series has the structure

The structure of the exponential and zeta-regulators are related by means of the Mellin transform. The one may be converted to the other by making use of the integral representation of the Gamma function:

which leads to the identity

relating the exponential and zeta-regulators, and converting poles in the s-plane to divergent terms in the Laurent series.

Heat kernel regularization
The sum

is sometimes called a heat kernel or a heat-kernel regularized sum; this name stems from the idea that the  can sometimes be understood as eigenvalues of the heat kernel. In mathematics, such a sum is known as a generalized Dirichlet series; its use for averaging is known as an Abelian mean. It is closely related to the Laplace–Stieltjes transform, in that

A number of theorems for the convergence of such a series exist. For example, by the Hardy-Littlewood Tauberian theorem, if 

then the series for  converges in the half-plane  and is uniformly convergent on every compact subset of the half-plane . In almost all applications to physics, one has

History
Much of the early work establishing the convergence and equivalence of series regularized with the heat kernel and zeta function regularization methods was done by G. H. Hardy and J. E. Littlewood in 1916 and is based on the application of the Cahen–Mellin integral. The effort was made in order to obtain values for various ill-defined, conditionally convergent sums appearing in number theory.

In terms of application as the regulator in physical problems, before , J. Stuart Dowker and Raymond Critchley in 1976 proposed a zeta-function regularization method for quantum physical problems. Emilio Elizalde and others have also proposed a method based on the zeta regularization for the integrals , here  is a regulator and the divergent integral depends on the numbers  in the limit  see renormalization. Also unlike other regularizations such as dimensional regularization and analytic regularization, zeta regularization has no counterterms and gives only finite results.

See also
 Generating function
 Perron's formula
 Renormalization
 1 + 1 + 1 + 1 + ⋯
 1 + 2 + 3 + 4 + ⋯
 Analytic torsion
 Ramanujan summation
 Minakshisundaram–Pleijel zeta function
 Zeta function (operator)

References

  Tom M. Apostol, "Modular Functions and Dirichlet Series in Number Theory", "Springer-Verlag New York. (See Chapter 8.)"
 A. Bytsenko, G. Cognola,  E. Elizalde,   V. Moretti and S. Zerbini, "Analytic Aspects of Quantum Fields", World Scientific Publishing, 2003,  
 G.H. Hardy and J.E. Littlewood, "Contributions to the Theory of the Riemann Zeta-Function and the Theory of the Distribution of Primes", Acta Mathematica, 41(1916) pp. 119–196. (See, for example, theorem 2.12)
 
  V. Moretti, "Direct z-function approach and renormalization of one-loop stress tensor in curved spacetimes, Phys. Rev.D 56, 7797 ''(1997).
 
 
 
 
  

Quantum field theory
String theory
Mathematical analysis
Zeta and L-functions
Summability methods